Sir Ralph Gore, 4th Baronet (c. 1675 – 23 February 1733) was a Speaker of the Irish House of Commons. He is now chiefly remembered for building Belle Isle Castle.

The Gore Baronetcy, of Magherabegg in the County of Donegal, was created in the Baronetage of Ireland on 2 February 1622 for Paul Gore (shown also as 1st baronet of Manor Gore, the Anglicized version). Ralph was the eldest son of Sir William Gore, 3rd Baronet and his wife Hannah Hamilton, daughter and co-heiress of James Hamilton of Manorhamilton and niece of Gustavus Hamilton, 1st Viscount Boyne. Ralph inherited the estate of Manorhamilton from his mother.

He was appointed High Sheriff of Leitrim for 1710.

The fourth Baronet served as Chancellor of the Irish Exchequer and as Speaker of the Irish House of Commons. He represented Donegal Borough in the Irish House of Commons from 1703 until 1713 and then Donegal County from 1713 until 1727. Subsequently, he sat for Clogher until his death in 1733.

Family
He married firstly Elizabeth Colville, daughter of  Sir Robert Colville of Newtown House, Newtownards,; Elizabeth was most likely the child of Colville's third wife Rose Leslie. Gore married secondly, Elizabeth Ashe, daughter of St George Ashe, Bishop of Clogher and his wife (and distant cousin) Jane St George, daughter of Sir George St George  of Dunmore, County Galway and Elizabeth Hannay. By his first wife, he had two daughters, including Rose, who married Anthony Malone,  Chancellor of the Irish Exchequer, but had no issue. By his second wife, he had seven children, including St George Gore-St George, who succeeded to the baronetcy, but died young without issue, Ralph Gore, 1st Earl of Ross, Richard, father of Sir Ralph Gore, 7th  baronet, and Elizabeth, who married James Daly and had issue, including the High Court judge St George Daly and the politician Denis Daly.

His grandfather had acquired Belle Island in Lough Erne: it was Ralph who built Belle Isle Castle on the island, which was extended and improved by his son, the younger Ralph.

The present holder of the baronetcy lives in Australia.

References

1670s births
1733 deaths
18th-century Anglo-Irish people
Baronets in the Baronetage of Ireland
High Sheriffs of Leitrim
Irish MPs 1703–1713
Irish MPs 1713–1714
Irish MPs 1715–1727
Irish MPs 1727–1760
Chancellors of the Exchequer of Ireland
Speakers of the Parliament of Ireland (pre-1801)
Members of the Privy Council of Ireland
Ralph
Members of the Parliament of Ireland (pre-1801) for County Donegal constituencies
Members of the Parliament of Ireland (pre-1801) for County Tyrone constituencies